Paul Marlowe is a Canadian author of historical fiction and science fiction. Much of his historical fiction is connected in some way with the Etheric Explorers Club, a Victorian society devoted to investigating unusual or supernatural phenomena.

Published works

Radio plays
The Resident Member (2009)
The Resident Member is a 30-minute comedy featuring the voice acting of Gideon Emery, Joe Vaz, Damon Berry, Digby Young, and Christa Schamberger-Young.

Novels

Series

The Wellborn Conspiracy
Sporeville (Sybertooth Incorporated, 2007) .
Knights of the Sea (2010)

Collections
Ether Frolics: Nine Tales from the Etheric Explorers Club (2012)

Short stories
Scientia Potentia Est (2000)
Airship Voyages Made Easy (2000)
For we being many... (2003)
A Visit from Prospero (2003)
Resurrection and Life (2004)
Krasnaya Luna (2004)
Venera Redux (2006)
The Night of Sevens (2006)
Ten Golden Roosters (2006)
The Mud Men of Tower Tunnel (2007)
The Incident at the 27th Meeting (2007)
66° South (2007)
The Resident Member (2008)
Alpha and Omega (2011)
Cotton Avicenna B iv (2011)
The Grinsfield Penitent (2014)

Awards and honours
 2008 — Sporeville was selected for Resource Links magazine's 2007  Year's Best list
 2010 — Marlowe's The Saguenay Cheese won a first prize in the James McIntyre poetry contest
 2013 — Ether Frolics was short listed for the Danuta Gleed Literary Award

See also
List of Canadian writers

References

External links
Paul Marlowe's web site

Gothic fiction
Canadian science fiction writers
Canadian humorists
Writers from New Brunswick
Canadian male novelists
Canadian historical novelists
Canadian male short story writers
Canadian children's writers
Living people
21st-century Canadian short story writers
21st-century Canadian male writers
Year of birth missing (living people)